Glaucias amyoti, commonly called the Australasian green shield bug or New Zealand vegetable bug, is a species of shield bug found in Australia, New Zealand, Timor and New Guinea.

Adults and juveniles feed off plants including certain Coprosma, Griselinia and Myoporum species.

References

Pentatomidae
Insects of Timor
Insects described in 1851
Hemiptera of New Zealand